This is a list of amphibians and reptiles found on the island of Saint Barthélemy, located in the Lesser Antilles chain in the Caribbean. It is taken from the last updated list of the fauna of Saint Barthélemy.

Amphibians
There are four species of amphibian on Saint Barthélemy, three of which were introduced.

Frogs (Anura)

Reptiles
Including marine turtles and introduced species, there are 20 reptile species reported on Saint Barthélemy.  One species, the blind snake Typhlops annae, is endemic to Saint Barthélemy.

Turtles (Testudines)

Lizards and snakes (Squamata)

Notes and references

 Amphibians
.
Saint Barthelemy
Saint Barthelemy
 Saint Barthelemy
 Saint Barthelemy
Saint Barthélemy